Buchepalli Siva Prasad Reddy is an Indian politician from Andhra Pradesh. He represented Darsi constituency in the 13th assembly term from the Indian National Congress (INC). After he joined YSR Congress Party (YSRCP) in 2014, he lost Darsi constituency. In 2019 he could not contest elections because of family problems. He studied in B.V. Subbayya school in Pernamitta. Prior to entering politics he did his doctorate from Sri Ramachandra medical college.

Political career 
Reddy entered politics and won the Mandal Parishad Territorial Constituency (MPTC) of Chimakurthy in August 2005 and was Mandal Parisath President.

Later, he contested as a Member of the Legislative Assembly (MLA) from Darsi constituency from Indian National Congress against Telugu Desam Party candidate Mannam Venkata Ramana, and won the election.

He contested from YSR Congress Party in 2014 and lost the election to Sidda Raghava Rao.

Reddy did not contest 2019 elections and extended his support to the party candidates suggested by his chief Jagan in Darsi and Santhanuthalapadu constituency, and played a pivotal role in their winning.

Development Activities 

15000 Pensions for old and disabled people
15000  ""Pakka houses"” for poor families
Tar and Cement roads for all villages from headquarters of each Mandal
CC roads to all SC & ST colonies
200 million worth Cement roads in Auvula Manda, Lakkavaram and Darsi villages
For farmers :  Part of irrigation, Sagar canal development works worth 1.20 billion with the help of World Bank loans ; Sanction of 132 KB substation and 33/11 Vidhyuth Substations (15) electric substations
Education : 2 KGBV schools per Mandal, 2 Model schools per Mandal & Gurukul school in Darsi

Social service 

Annual mega health camps and eye surgeries
Praksam akshra vijayam programs

See also 
 Darsi
 Santhanuthalapadu

References 

Andhra Pradesh MLAs 2009–2014
YSR Congress Party politicians
People from Prakasam district
Living people
1980 births